Elkhorn Grove is an unincorporated community in Carroll County, Illinois, United States. Elkhorn Grove is located on Elkhorn Creek north-northeast of Milledgeville.

Notable people from Elkhorn Grove include early Colorado state senator and mine owner Henry Neikirk, who was born there and attended the nearby Mount Carroll Seminary (later known as Shimer College) before heading west to make his fortune.

References

Unincorporated communities in Carroll County, Illinois
Unincorporated communities in Illinois